Aletopus ruspina is a moth of the  family Noctuidae. It is found in the Republic of Congo.

References

Endemic fauna of the Republic of the Congo
Moths described in 1909
Agaristinae
Fauna of the Republic of the Congo
Moths of Africa